Tiago de Paula Peixoto is a Brazilian physicist who works in the areas of Network Science, Statistical Physics, and Complex Systems. He is currently an Associate Professor of Network and Data Science at the Central European University.

Career
Peixoto is mostly known for his work in statistical inference in networks. He developed and maintains the graph manipulation library graph-tool, which contains readily available implementations of the methods he proposes in his publications.

Peixoto graduated with a bachelor's degree in physics from the University of São Paulo in 2003. He earned a PhD in Physics from the same university in 2007, advised by Carmen Pimentel Cintra do Prado with a dissertation entitled "Dynamics of the epicenters of the Olami-Feder-Christensen model of earthquakes (OFC)". In 2017 he obtained his Habilitation in Theoretical Physics at the University of Bremen.

Peixoto worked as a post-doctoral fellow in Germany (2008 - 2016) at the Technische Universität Darmstadt and University of Bremen before becoming an assistant professor (lecturer), in 2016, at the Department of Mathematics of the University of Bath. In 2019, he joined the faculty of the Central European University as an associate professor.

Awards and honors
In 2019, Peixoto was awarded the prestigious Erdős–Rényi Prize in Network Science for his contributions for the statistical inference of network modules (aka communities), statistical analysis and network visualization. He was also the sixth recipient of the Zachary Karate Club CLUB prize.

References

External links

Web Page  at the Central European University.
Web Page at the ISI Foundation.
LinkedIn Profile

Living people
Brazilian scientists
Brazilian physicists
Complex systems scientists
University of São Paulo alumni
Academic staff of Central European University
Year of birth missing (living people)
Academic staff of Technische Universität Darmstadt